Demuth Museum in Lancaster, Pennsylvania, United States, is a museum dedicated to the paintings of Charles Demuth (1883–1935) located in his former studio and home at 120 East King Street. The museum offers a rotating view of a permanent collection which includes 42 Charles Demuth originals as well as artists and works that present a Demuth connection in the areas of theme, technique and epoch. Two recent exhibitions have featured Demuth contemporaries Alfred H. Maurer and Lyonel Feininger.
The house was built c. 1820 and is a contributing property to the Lancaster Historic District.

In addition to 10,000 annual visitors, the museum is regarded as an education center for students and scholars who access the archives and library for research purposes.

Admission is free. Every first weekend in June is the annual Demuth garden tour, which includes the Victorian garden at the museum, and about twenty other town and country gardens from which Demuth drew inspiration.

See also
 List of single-artist museums

References

External links
Official website

Art museums and galleries in Pennsylvania
Museums in Lancaster, Pennsylvania
Museums of American art
Demuth, Charles
Art museums established in 1981
1981 establishments in Pennsylvania
Museums devoted to one artist
Historic district contributing properties in Pennsylvania
Charles Demuth